San Giuliano Terme is a comune (municipality) in the Province of Pisa in the Italian region Tuscany, located about  west of Florence and about  northeast of Pisa.

Main sights 
The area of the Pisa hills was already an attraction for enlightened travellers in the early 18th century with the growth of the thermal spa of San Giuliano, just like those narrated by Carlo Goldoni and which we can continue to enjoy today.
Among the prominent houses in the region are:
Villa di Agnano 
Villa Le Molina 
Villa Roncioni 
Villa Tadini Buoninsegni
Villa Alta
Villa di Corliano. It houses frescoes painted by Andrea Boscoli from 1592.

Notable people from San Giuliano Terme
Alberto Batistoni, football player
Massimo Barbuti, football player
Massimo Carmassi, architect
Diego Fabbrini, football player
Francesco Morini, football player
Leo Pardi, zoologist and ethologist

Twin towns
 Bad Tölz, Germany, since 2003

References

External links

 Official website
 Health and Nature in Tuscany

Cities and towns in Tuscany